John Carlyle and Anita Sherrill House is a historic home located at Mount Ulla, Rowan County, North Carolina.  It was built in 1937–1938, and is a two-story, Colonial Revival-style brick dwelling. It has a tall hipped roof and a classical one-story entrance porch supported by Tuscan order columns.  Also on the property is a contributing garage built about 1920.

It was listed on the National Register of Historic Places in 2009.

References

Houses on the National Register of Historic Places in North Carolina
Colonial Revival architecture in North Carolina
Houses completed in 1938
Houses in Rowan County, North Carolina
National Register of Historic Places in Rowan County, North Carolina
1938 establishments in North Carolina